"Londonistan"  is an Islamophobic sobriquet referring to the British capital of London and the growing Muslim population of late-20th- and early-21st-century London.

The word is a portmanteau of the UK's capital and the Persian suffix -stan, meaning "land" used by several countries in South and Central Asia. The term has been used in a number of publications, including The New York Times, Vanity Fair, The Weekly Standard, and in the 2006 book Londonistan: How Britain is Creating a Terror State Within.

Origin of the term

According to Omar Nasiri:

The mid- to late 1990s were the years when Britain's capital earned the sobriquet of "Londonistan," a title provided by French officials infuriated at the growing presence of Islamist radicals in London and the failure of British authorities to do anything about it. [...] Raids in France and Belgium had produced phone and fax numbers linked to the United Kingdom, and names of suspects were passed on. Some French officials believe that if more had been done by Britain at the time, the network behind the summer of 1995 bombings might have been broken up and the attacks prevented.

The bombings and attempted bombings, mostly in the French capital of Paris, in the summer and autumn of 1995 by Armed Islamic Group (GIA), killed eight people and injured more than 100. The French observed that a number of Muslim radicals from London had connections to these bombings. Around 1995, the French intelligence had coined the term "Londonistan" for the city of London.

According to critics, the UK's "deep tradition of civil liberties and protection of political activists" led to the country becoming "a crossroads for would-be terrorists" for a decade after the mid-1990s. The Islamists used London "as a home base" to "raise money, recruit members and draw inspiration from the militant messages." The UK Government's perceived unwillingness to prosecute or extradite terrorist suspects provoked tensions with countries in which terrorist attacks occurred. Allegations of a British policy of appeasement of Islamists were made and denied by members of the British Government who debated the issue.

Late 1980s onwards
In March 2020 Jonathan Evans, Former Director General, MI5 gave an interview and commented on Londonistan: 'There are various conspiracy theories about the Londonistan period including the notion that Her Majesty’s Government (HMG) in some way gave a free pass to the terrorist sympathizers in the U.K. on the basis that they would not attack us. This is a complete fabrication. The problem was that we didn’t actually know what was going on because we were not looking. There was all sorts of stuff going on that we just were not aware of. It was not that we were deliberately turning a blind eye, just that we had not noticed'.

The term has been linked to the similar Islamophobic conspiracy theory of Eurabia.

Appropriation
With the election of Sadiq Khan as Mayor of London, Richard Seymour wrote an essay in Al Jazeera headlined "Sadiq Khan's victory and free Londonistan", claiming that the term Londonistan was being "joyfully, ironically appropriated by those who are glad to see a racist campaign defeated. Welcome to the 21st century. Welcome to free Londonistan."

See also 

Islamism in the United Kingdom
Islam in the United Kingdom
 Islam in London

References

External links 
Sean O'Neill Why France lived in fear of 'Londonistan', Daily Telegraph (13 Oct 2001)
London Review of Books’ In the Streets of Londonistan (22 Jan 2004)
New Statesman’s Why the French call us Londonistan (9 Dec 2002)
Jamestown Foundation: Stephen Ulph on Londonistan (26 Feb 2004)
Combating Terrorism Center: The Changing Scene in Londonistan  (3 Feb 2010)

Usage in the Arabic press 
at Ash-Sharq al-Awsat, 22 August 2005
at Al-Arabiya, 17 October 2010

Eurabia
Islam-related controversies
Social history of London
Islam in London